The Skoog is a customizable electronic musical instrument that has been designed to be inclusive and accessible – especially to those unable to play conventional musical instruments. Its primary market is special needs education and music therapy.

The Skoog itself is a soft cube that plugs, via USB, into a computer running its accompanying software, which uses physical modeling technology to allow direct correlations between the expressive gestures the player makes on the Skoog and the sound that comes out of the software. The current version of the software features twenty one such instruments. The Skoog can also be used as a MIDI controller, as well as a sampler.

See also 

  System for making music by disrupting laser beams

References

Electronic musical instruments